A drawbar is a solid coupling between a hauling vehicle and its hauled load.  Drawbars are in common use with rail transport, road trailers, both large and small, industrial and recreational, and with agricultural equipment.

Agriculture and horse-drawn vehicles 
Agricultural equipment is hauled by a tractor mounted drawbar.  Specialist agricultural tools such as ploughs are attached to specialist drawbars which have functions in addition to transmitting tractive force. This was partly made redundant with Ferguson's development of the 3 point linkage in his famous TE20.
A wooden drawbar extends from the front of a wagon, cart, chariot or other horse-drawn vehicles to between the horses. A steel drawbar attaches a three-point hitch or other farm implement to a tractor.

Road
A drawbar is a towing or pushing connection between a tractive vehicle and its load.

Light vehicles
On light vehicles, the most common coupling is an A-frame drawbar coupled to a 1 7/8 inch or 50 mm tow ball. These drawbars transmit around 10% of the gross trailer weight through the coupling.

Heavy vehicles
The direction of haulage may be push or pull, though pushing tends to be for a pair of ballast tractors working, one pulling and the other pushing an exceptional load on a specialist trailer. The most common drawbar configuration for heavy vehicles is an A-frame drawbar at the front of a full trailer that connects to a tow coupling on a hauling vehicle

On heavy vehicles, the drawbar is coupled using a drawbar eye, typically of 40 mm or 50 mm diameter, connected to a bolt and pin coupling. Commonly seen brands include Ringfeder, V. Orlandi and Jost Rockinger. These drawbars transmit little or no downwards force through the coupling.

The drawbar should not be confused with the fifth wheel coupling.  The drawbar requires a trailer which either loads the drawbar lightly (for example a small boat trailer, or caravan, or the load is the weight of the coupling components only (larger trailers, usually but not always with a steerable hauled axle, front or rear). By contrast, the fifth wheel is designed to transmit a proportion of the load's weight to the hauling vehicle. Drawbar configuration is mostly seen on hydraulic modular trailer and ballast tractor combination to haul oversize loads which require special trailer and tractor.

Drawbar eye
A drawbar eye, also called tow eye, is a mechanical part to connect an independent trailer/dolly via a drawbar coupling to a tractor. the eye is connected to the front end of a drawbar with bolt, flange-mounting or welding. Most made from high tension material to bear heavy loads while being pulled by the tractor. The eye is made in the shape of an "i" with a hole at top which is locked in the drawbar coupling and the lower part is mounted to the drawbar making it an essential connector between the drawbar and drawbar coupling. The drawbar eye is used in many heavy transport operations around the world. It is mostly used for agriculture equipment, construction equipment, road trains, dolly trailers, full trailer and hydraulic modular trailers.

Rail

Two or more passenger or freight cars may be attached by means of a drawbar. At both extremes there is a regular coupler such as the North American Janney coupler or the Russian SA3 coupler. This drawbar eliminates slack action.

Rail applications 
 MR-90
 MR-63
 MR-73
 MPM-10
 Drawgear

See also 

 Ballast tractor   
 Drawbar force gauge
 Drawgear
 Fifth Wheel and Gooseneck
 Fifth wheel coupling
 Jumper cable
 Ringfeder
 Three point hitch
 Tow hitch

References

External links 

 
 
 

Agricultural machinery
Couplers
Trucks
Transport operations
Articulated vehicles
Heavy equipment